Francesca Maria La'O (born 7 May 1976) is a Filipina former professional tennis player.

La'o, who was highest ever ranked Filipino singles player on the WTA Tour for a time with a WTA rank of 386, was a Southeast Asian Games doubles gold medalist and featured in 19 Fed Cup ties for the Philippines, with her first stint in the team from 1991 to 1995.

Between 1996 and 1999, La'O played collegiate tennis with UC Berkeley and earned NCAA All-American honors.

In 2003, she came back for one final Fed Cup season, before retiring with eight singles and nine doubles wins.

ITF finals

Doubles: 3 (1–2)

References

External links
 
 
 

1976 births
Living people
Filipino female tennis players
California Golden Bears women's tennis players
Southeast Asian Games medalists in tennis
Southeast Asian Games gold medalists for the Philippines
Southeast Asian Games silver medalists for the Philippines
Competitors at the 1991 Southeast Asian Games
Competitors at the 1993 Southeast Asian Games